Allergy UK is a British medical charity dedicated to helping adults and children with their allergies. The charity was founded in 1991 as the British Allergy Foundation, and in 2002 the operational name of the charity became Allergy UK. Allergy UK endorses certain products that restrict or remove high levels of allergens and gives them a Seal of Approval.

National lobbying
Allergy UK is a founding member of the National Allergy Strategy Group, a coalition of charities, professional organisations and industry, that seeks to improve health services for allergy sufferers in the UK.

See also
 Allergy

References

Further reading

External links
 
 
 National Allergy Strategy Group

Health charities in the United Kingdom